Bashir Ahmed Halepoto (died 23 March 2021) was a Pakistani politician who had been a Member of the Provincial Assembly of Sindh, from May 2013 to May 2018.

Political career

He was elected to the Provincial Assembly of Sindh as a candidate of Pakistan Peoples Party (PPP) from Constituency PS-55 Badin-cum-T.M.Khan (I) in 2013 Pakistani general election.

He was re-elected to Provincial Assembly of Sindh as a candidate of PPP from Constituency PS-70 (Badin-I) in 2018 Pakistani general election.

Death
He died on 23 March 2021.

References

2021 deaths
Sindh MPAs 2013–2018
Pakistan People's Party MPAs (Sindh)
Sindh MPAs 2018–2023
Year of birth missing